Ayaştürkmenli is a small village in Silifke district of Mersin Province, Turkey. At  it is situated in the Taurus Mountains to the west of Limonlu Creek, (Lamos Creek of the antiquity). The population of Ayaştürkmenli was 36  as of 2011. It is a very small settlement. But it still keeps its legal entity as a village.

References

Villages in Silifke District